Ojciec Mateusz (English: Father Matthew) is a Polish television drama series, which has aired on TVP1 since November 11, 2008. It is a Polish version of the Italian detective series Don Matteo broadcast in Italy by Rai Uno.

Series overview

Episodes

Season 1 (2008–2009)

Season 2 (2009)

Season 3 (2010)

Season 4 (2010)

Season 5 (2011)

Season 6 (2011)

Season 7 (2012)

Season 8 (2012)

Season 9 (2013)

Season 10 (2013)

Season 11 (2014)

Season 12 (2014)

Season 13 (2015)

Season 14 (2015)

Season 15 (2016)

Season 16 (2016)

Season 17 (2017)

Season 18 (2017)

Season 19 (2018)

Season 20 (2018)

Season 21 (2019)

Season 22 (2019)

Season 23 (2020)

Season 24 (2020)

Season 25 (2021)

Season 26 (2021)

Season 27 (2022)

Season 28 (2022) 

Season 28 is scheduled for broadcast in 2022.

Season 29 (2023)

References

Polish drama television series
Polish television series